The MTH R 422-CG is an Austrian aircraft engine, designed and produced by MTH Engines of Mattsee for use in ultralight aircraft.

Design and development
The engine is a twin-cylinder two-stroke, in-line,  displacement, liquid-cooled, gasoline engine design, with a toothed mechanical gearbox reduction drive with a reduction ratio of 3.0:1. It employs dual electronic ignition systems and produces  at 6500 rpm, with a compression ratio of 12:1.

Specifications (R 422-CG)

See also

References

External links

MTH aircraft engines
Two-stroke aircraft piston engines
Liquid-cooled aircraft piston engines
2000s aircraft piston engines